John Beeston (17 January 1831 – 1 June 1873) was an Australian cricketer. He played three first-class matches for New South Wales between 1857/58 and 1860/61.

See also
 List of New South Wales representative cricketers

References

External links
 

1831 births
1873 deaths
Australian cricketers
New South Wales cricketers